Survival City is a 1955 American short documentary film directed by Anthony Muto. In 1956, at the 28th Academy Awards, it won an Oscar for Best Short Subject (One-Reel).

References

External links 

1955 films
Live Action Short Film Academy Award winners
American black-and-white films
20th Century Fox short films
American short documentary films
1950s short documentary films
1955 documentary films
1955 short films
1950s English-language films
1950s American films